Protein arginine N-methyltransferase 1 is an enzyme that in humans is encoded by the PRMT1 gene. The HRMT1L2 gene encodes a protein arginine methyltransferase that functions as a histone methyltransferase specific for histone H4.

Function 

PRMT1 gene encodes for the protein arginine methyltransferase that functions as a histone methyltransferase specific for histone H4 in eukaryotic cells. Specifically altering histone H4 in eukaryotes gives it the ability to remodel chromatin acting as a post-translational modifier.

Through regulation of gene expression, arginine methyltransferases control the cell cycle and death of eukaryotic cells.

Reaction pathway 

While all PRMT enzymes catalyze the methylation of arginine residues in proteins, PRMT1 is unique in that is catalyzes the formation of asymmetric dimethylarginine as opposed to the PRMT2 that catalyzes the formation of symmetrically dimethylated arginine. Individual PRMT utilize S-adenosyl-L-methionine (SAM) as the methyl donor and catalyze methyl group transfer to the ω-nitrogen of an arginine residue.

Clinical significance 

In humans, these enzymes regulate gene expression and hence are involved in pathogenesis of many human diseases. Using enzyme inhibitors for arginine methyltransferase 1, studies were able to demonstrate the enzyme's potential as an early catalyst of various cancers.

Interactions 
PRMT1 has been shown to interact with:

 BTG1, 
 BTG2, 
 DHX9, 
 FUS, 
 HNRNPR, 
 HNRPK, 
 IFNAR1, 
 ILF3, 
 KHDRBS1,  and
 SUPT5H.

Model organisms 

Model organisms have been used to study PRMT1 function and structure.

A conditional knockout mouse line, called Prmt1tm1a(EUCOMM)Wtsi was generated as part of the International Knockout Mouse Consortium program—a high-throughput mutagenesis project to generate and distribute animal models of disease to interested scientists.

Male and female animals underwent a standardized phenotypic screen to determine the effects of deletion. Twenty three tests were carried out on mutant mice and three significant abnormalities were observed. No homozygous mutant embryos were identified during gestation, and thus none survived until weaning. The remaining tests were carried out on heterozygous mutant adult mice and females displayed increased circulating creatinine levels.

References

Further reading

External links 
 

Genes mutated in mice